The Changhe M70 is an MPV produced by Changhe.

Since December 2016, the vehicle is being built in Jiujiang. In China, the M70, which seats up to eight, has been sold since March 2017. It competes in particular with the successful Baojun 730.

References

M70
Minivans
Cars introduced in 2016